Two ships of the Royal Navy have been named HMS Ledbury, named after Ledbury Hunt, Herefordshire:

 The first , launched in 1940 was a  that served in World War II and was sold for scrap in 1958. 

External links 
 History of HMS Ledbury from the VisitLedbury.co.uk

Royal Navy ship names